Louie Schwartzberg (born February 21, 1950) is an American director, producer, and cinematographer. Since 2004, Schwartzberg has worked as a director for films, including the 2019 film, Fantastic Fungi, and the 2014 Netflix series, Moving Art.

Schwartzberg is recognized as a pioneer in high-end time-lapse cinematography. Schwartzberg is a visual artist who focuses on connections between humans and the subtleties of nature and environment.

Early life and education
Schwartzberg grew up in Brooklyn, and his parents were Jewish Holocaust survivors. He graduated from UCLA Film School with an MFA in the early seventies.  Schwartzberg chaired and served as executive director of the Action! Vote Coalition and served on the board of the Earth Communications Office and the Environmental Media Association. He is a member of both the Directors Guild of America and the Academy of Motion Arts and Sciences.

Career
Schwartzberg is credited by many with pioneering the contemporary stock footage industry by founding Energy Film Library, a global company, which was acquired by Getty Images in 1997.

In 2012 completed Wings of Life, a documentary feature for Disneynature, narrated by Meryl Streep. It won Best Theatrical Program at the Jackson Hole Science Media Awards 2012, and also won a Best Cinematography Roscar Award. The film reveals the fragile relationship between flowers and their pollination partners.

In November, 2013 Mysteries of the Unseen World, a 3D-IMAX film with National Geographic was released in theaters worldwide. The film is a journey into invisible worlds that are too slow, too fast, too small and too vast for the human eye to see.

In 2013, Schwartzberg founded the company Moving Art, which produces High Definition 2D and 3D movies featuring nature, cityscapes, and visual effects. He also founded the large format film company, BlackLight Films, featuring content such as documentaries and children's programming. Projects include America's Heart and Soul a story of Americans who are remarkable in their everyday lives, for Walt Disney Pictures; “America!”, a 26-episode half-hour series for The Hallmark Channel; and “Chasing the Light,” a one-hour documentary that aired on PBS.

On April 6, 2014, he appeared in an interview with Oprah Winfrey on Super Soul Sunday (OWN TV) episode titled, The World Beyond What We Can See. For Netflix, he also made the series called Moving Art with six topics; flowers, forests, oceans, deserts, underwater and waterfalls. The seventh topic, about mushrooms, is the film Fantastic Fungi, released in 2019. Netflix has an additional six topics lined up: Koh Samui, Iceland, Africa, Angkor Wat, whales and dolphins, Big Sur and the Galapagos.

Speaking engagements
Schwartzberg is active in the TED community, having spoken in 2011 at the following: TEDxSoCal, TEDxSF and TEDxJacksonhole, TEDxSMU, and TED Vancouver in March 2014. He has delivered speeches at NASA, Global Spa and Wellness Summit, The Nantucket Project and Bioneers. His YouTube videos have collected over 60 million views.

Filmography

Bibliography

Awards

Schwartzberg has won two Clio Awards for Best Environmental Public Service Spots, an Emmy nomination for Best Cinematography for the Discovery Channel special Oceans of Air, and the Heartland Film Festival's Truly Moving Picture Award for Walt Disney Pictures’ release, America’s Heart and Soul. Schwartzberg was recognized as one of the top 70 Cinematographers for the On Film Kodak Salute Series. He is a member of the Directors Guild of America and the Academy of Motion Pictures Arts and Sciences.

References

External links
 Moving Art by Louie Schwartzberg, website
 

1950 births
Living people
American cinematographers
American Jews
UCLA Film School alumni
People from Brooklyn
Place of birth missing (living people)
American documentary filmmakers
Film directors from New York City